Burgruine Kaja is a castle in Lower Austria, Austria.

See also
List of castles in Austria

References
This article was initially translated from the German Wikipedia.
Castles in Lower Austria